The Sankenbach Waterfalls are a cascade southwest of the village of Baiersbronn in the Black Forest in Germany. The Sankenbach flows over the waterfalls, dropping a total of 40 metres. The falls drop down the headwall of the cirque of the Sankenbach Bowl (Sankenbachkessel) in the Eckscher Horizon (Eck’scher Horizont) of the Lower Bunter Sandstone. Shortly afterwards the  Sankenbach feeds the Sankenbachsee.

The volume of the waterfall can be regulated by visitors by impounding the inflowing water in a small retaining basin above the upper waterfall using a slider. The volume of the cascading water increases for a while after the slider is lifted. It is operated from a footbridge which crosses the little reservoir by means of a long wooden lever.

References 

Waterfalls of Germany
Geography of the Black Forest
Freudenstadt (district)
WSankenbachwasserfalle